Mike D. Lane Field is a baseball venue in Florence, Alabama, United States. It is home to the North Alabama Lions baseball team of the NCAA Division I ASUN Conference. The facility has a capacity of 1,500 spectators and is named for former head coach Mike D. Lane who has the most wins in North Alabama history.

History 
On April 3, 2019, the city of Florence gifted the university a plot of land next to the softball field to relocate Mike D. Lane Field.

Features 
The field's features include an grass playing surface, a press box, an electronic scoreboard, dugouts, a brick backstop, restrooms, and concessions.

See also 
 List of NCAA Division I baseball venues

External links
Mike D. Lane Field - North Alabama

References 

College baseball venues in the United States
Baseball venues in Alabama
North Alabama Lions baseball
1984 establishments in Alabama
Sports venues completed in 1984